Straight from the Heart is the seventh studio album by American recording artist Patrice Rushen, released on April 14, 1982, by Elektra Records. It features her most recognizable song, "Forget Me Nots", the oft-sampled "Remind Me" and the popular instrumental workout "Number One". Straight from the Heart scored Rushen her first two nominations at the 1983 Grammy Awards for Best Female R&B Vocal Performance for "Forget Me Nots" and Best R&B Instrumental Performance for "Number One".

The album is Rushen's most successful album to date, peaking inside the top 20 of the Billboard 200 chart at number 14. The success of "Forget Me Nots" is considered the major contributor to the album's popularity at the time of its release.

Critical reception 
In a contemporary review for The Village Voice, music critic Robert Christgau gave Straight from the Heart a "C+" and said that he prefers side one's "dancy vamp" over the songwriting on side two by Rushen, whom he called a fashionable "ingenue". In a retrospective review, AllMusic's Andy Kellman gave it four and a half out of five stars and called it "an early-'80s jazz-pop-R&B synthesis as durable and pleasing as any other".

In 2018, Pitchfork ranked Straight From the Heart #194 on its list of the 200 Greatest Albums of the 1980s.

Track listing

Charts

Personnel 

 Patrice Rushen – lead and backing vocals, arrangements, electric piano (1, 3, 5, 7, 8), synthesizers (1, 5, 7, 8), acoustic piano (2), percussion (2, 3, 5, 8), horn arrangements (2), clavinet (3, 6), vocal arrangements (3), synthesizer arrangements (7), guitar (9)
 Charles Mims Jr. – electric piano (2), horn arrangements (2), backing vocals (6), acoustic piano (7), synthesizers (7), synthesizer arrangements (7)
 Paul Jackson Jr. – guitar (2, 3, 6), acoustic guitar (5)
 Wali Ali – electric guitar (5)
 Marlo Henderson – lead guitar (6), guitar solo (6)
 Freddie Washington – bass (1, 2, 3, 5, 6, 7)
 Melvin Webb – drums (1, 2)
 Tony St. James – drums (3, 7) 
 James Gadson – drums (5, 8)
 Ollie E. Brown – drums (6)
 Ulysses Duprée – percussion (3)
 Paulinho da Costa – percussion (9)
 Gerald Albright – saxophone (1, 2)
 Clay Lawry – trombone (2), bass trombone (2)
 Ray Brown – trumpet (2)
 Roy Galloway – backing vocals (1, 2, 5, 7, 8, 9), lead vocals (3), vocal arrangement (3)
 Jeanette Hawes – backing vocals (2)
 Lynn Davis – backing vocals (3, 5-8)
 Karen Evans – backing vocals (3)
 Brenda Russell – backing vocals (6)

Production 
 Executive Producer – Patrice Rushen
 Produced by Patrice Rushen and Charles Mims Jr.
 Recorded by Peter Chaikin
 Additional Recording by Philip Moores
 Assistant Engineer – Greg Stout
 Remixing – F. Byron Clark (Tracks 1-5, 8 & 9); Phillip Moores (Tracks 6 & 7).
 Mastered by John Golden at K-Disc Mastering (Hollywood, CA). 
 Copyist – Greg Modster
 Art Direction – Ron Coro
 Design – John Barr and Ron Coro
 Photography – Bobby Holland

References

External links 
 

1982 albums
Patrice Rushen albums
Elektra Records albums